The former Morrilton Post Office is a historic post office building at 117 North Division Street in downtown Morrilton, Arkansas.  It is a single-story masonry structure, built of brick and limestone in a simplified Art Deco style.  Its facade is divided into five bays, the outer two separated by brick piers from the inner three.  The inner three are articulated by limestone pilasters, and feature large multipane windows and the main entrance.  The interior features a mural entitled "Men at Rest" by Richard Sargent, painted in the 1930s as part of a federal works project.

The building was listed on the National Register of Historic Places in 1998.

The building currently houses the Conway County Office of Emergency Management and Conway County 911 Services.

See also 

National Register of Historic Places listings in Conway County, Arkansas
List of United States post offices

References

External links

Post office buildings on the National Register of Historic Places in Arkansas
Art Deco architecture in Arkansas
Government buildings completed in 1936
Buildings and structures in Morrilton, Arkansas
Post office buildings in Arkansas
Individually listed contributing properties to historic districts on the National Register in Arkansas
National Register of Historic Places in Conway County, Arkansas
1936 establishments in Arkansas